The Hawker Centre is a sports ground in Kingston-upon-Thames, Surrey. Originally the Hawker's Sports Ground, it was built and owned by the Hawker Aircraft company who had factories in Kingston-upon-Thames. The ground was known prior to 1948 as the Leyland Motors Ground, due to Hawker leasing their factory to Leyland Motors, a lease which expired in 1948. The aircraft factory was demolished in 1990 which alongside storage units were converted into a residential area keeping the sports ground. Since 2001 the ground has been maintained by the YMCA St Paul's Group under a lease by the Borough.

Cricket
The first recorded match on the ground was in 1944, when Leyland Athletic played London Counties. The ground hosted its first first-class match in 1946, when Surrey played Hampshire. These first matches were organised to help raise money to repair the damage done to The Oval in the Second World War. A venue for first-class cricket from 1946 to 1953, it hosted first-class cricket for no less than seven teams, with the final first-class match at the ground in 1953 seeing an England XI play a Commonwealth XI.

References

External links
Hawker's Sports Ground on CricketArchive
Hawker's Sports Ground on Cricinfo
Hawker Centre on [YMCA St Paul's group]

Cricket grounds in Surrey
British Leyland
Surrey County Cricket Club grounds
Sports venues in the Royal Borough of Kingston upon Thames
Sports venues completed in 1944
YMCA buildings